Prevale is a small settlement in the hills south of Dole in the Municipality of Litija in central Slovenia. It no longer has any permanent residents. The area is part of the traditional region of Lower Carniola. It is now included with the rest of the municipality in the Central Sava Statistical Region.

References

External links
Prevale on Geopedia

Populated places in the Municipality of Litija